The Bank Notes (Scotland) Act 1765 (5 Geo. 3 c. 49) was an Act of the Parliament of Great Britain that introduced restrictions on the use of banknotes by the Scottish banks. The act was from the Fourth Session of the Twelfth Parliament of Great Britain at Westminster; beginning May 19, 1761 and lasting until January 10, 1765.

The Bank of Scotland had introduced an "optional clause" on their banknotes in 1730 whereby its conversion into gold on demand could be delayed for up to 6 months, at which point the face value plus 5% should be payable. By the 1760s similar clauses were being adopted by the competitor banks in Scotland. An observed consequence was that in 1762–4 the banknotes had been trading at 4% below the gold coin value. Use of such clauses was prohibited by the 1765 Act.

The Act also stipulated that banknotes should not be issued for sums under £1. Prior to the Act, some banks had been issuing notes for amounts as low as one shilling or even one penny.

The Act was repealed in 1993.

References

Further reading

External links

Great Britain Acts of Parliament 1765
Economy of Scotland
Currencies of Scotland
Banking legislation in the United Kingdom